In mathematics, a partition of unity of a topological space  is a set  of continuous functions from  to the unit interval [0,1] such that for every point :

Partitions of unity are useful because they often allow one to extend local constructions to the whole space.  They are also important in the interpolation of data, in signal processing, and the theory of spline functions.

Existence 
The existence of partitions of unity assumes two distinct forms:

 Given any open cover  of a space, there exists a partition  indexed over the same set  such that supp  Such a partition is said to be subordinate to the open cover 

Thus one chooses either to have the supports indexed by the open cover, or compact supports.  If the space is compact, then there exist partitions satisfying both requirements.

A finite open cover always has a continuous partition of unity subordinated to it, provided the space is locally compact and Hausdorff. 
Paracompactness of the space is a necessary condition to guarantee the existence of a partition of unity subordinate to any open cover.  Depending on the category to which the space belongs, it may also be a sufficient condition.  The construction uses mollifiers (bump functions), which exist in continuous and smooth manifolds, but not in analytic manifolds. Thus for an open cover of an analytic manifold, an analytic partition of unity subordinate to that open cover generally does not exist. See analytic continuation.

The tensor product of functions act as

Example 
Now, let  be a bump function on  defined by  then, both this function and  can be extended uniquely onto  by setting .

Variant definitions
Sometimes a less restrictive definition is used: the sum of all the function values at a particular point is only required to be positive, rather than 1, for each point in the space.  However, given such a set of functions  one can obtain a partition of unity in the strict sense by dividing by the sum; the partition becomes  where , which is well defined since at each point only a finite number of terms are nonzero. Even further, some authors drop the requirement that the supports be locally finite, requiring only that  for all .

Applications
A partition of unity can be used to define the integral (with respect to a volume form) of a function defined over a manifold: One first defines the integral of a function whose support is contained in a single coordinate patch of the manifold; then one uses a partition of unity to define the integral of an arbitrary function; finally one shows that the definition is independent of the chosen partition of unity.

A partition of unity can be used to show the existence of a Riemannian metric on an arbitrary manifold.

Method of steepest descent employs a partition of unity to construct asymptotics of integrals.

Linkwitz–Riley filter is an example of practical implementation of partition of unity to separate input signal into two output signals containing only high- or low-frequency components.

The Bernstein polynomials of a fixed degree m are a family of m+1 linearly independent polynomials that are a partition of unity for the unit interval .

Partitions of unity are used to establish global smooth approximations for Sobolev functions in bounded domains.

See also

Gluing axiom
Fine sheaf

References

 , see chapter 13

External links
General information on partition of unity at [Mathworld]

Differential topology
Topology